The World Fantasy Awards are given each year by the World Fantasy Convention for the best fantasy fiction and art published during the preceding calendar year. The awards have been described by sources such as The Guardian as a "prestigious fantasy prize", and one of the three most renowned speculative fiction awards, along with the Hugo and Nebula Awards (which cover both fantasy and science fiction). The World Fantasy Award—Artist is given each year to artists of works related to fantasy released in the preceding calendar year. Fantasy artists are also eligible for the Special Award—Professional category. The Artist category has been awarded annually since 1975.

World Fantasy Award nominees and winners are decided by attendees and judges at the annual World Fantasy Convention. A ballot is posted in June for attendees of the current and previous two conferences to determine two of the finalists, and a panel of five judges adds three or more nominees before voting on the overall winner. The panel of judges is typically made up of fantasy authors and is chosen each year by the World Fantasy Awards Administration, which has the power to break ties. The final results are presented at the World Fantasy Convention at the end of October. Winners were presented with a statue in the form of a bust of H. P. Lovecraft through the 2015 awards; more recent winners receive a statuette of a tree.

During the 48 nomination years, 99 artists have been nominated; 41 of them have won, including ties. Three artists have won three times: Shaun Tan, out of five nominations; Charles Vess, out of eight; and Michael Whelan, out of nine. Five other artists have won twice: Thomas Canty, out of nine nominations; Lee Brown Coye and Rovina Cai, both times they were nominated; Edward Gorey, out of four; and J. K. Potter, out of ten. No other artists have won more than once. Potter and John Picacio have received the most nominations at ten, followed by Canty, Don Maitz, and Whelan at nine each. Stephen Fabian and John Jude Palencar are tied at eight for the most nominations without winning.

Winners and nominees
In the following table, the years correspond to the date of the ceremony, rather than when the artist's work was published. Entries with a blue background and an asterisk (*) next to the artist's name have won the award; those with a white background are the other nominees on the shortlist.

  *   Winners

References

External links
 World Fantasy Convention official site

Visual arts awards
Awards established in 1975
Artist